The 1929 Norwegian Football Cup was the 28th season of the Norwegian annual knockout football tournament. The tournament was open for all members of NFF, except those from Northern Norway. The final was played at Stavanger Stadion in Stavanger on 20 October 1929, and was contested by the defending champions Ørn and Sarpsborg, who had last won the tournament in 1917. Sarpsborg won the final 2-1 after extra time, and secured their second Norwegian Cup championship.

Rounds and dates
 First round:4 August.
 Second round: 11 August.
 Third round: 25 August.
 Fourth round: 1 September.
 Quarter-finals: 15 September.
 Semi-finals: 6 October.
 Final: 14 October.

First round 

|-
|colspan="3" style="background-color:#97DEFF"|Replay

|}

Second round 

|-
|colspan="3" style="background-color:#97DEFF"|Replay

|}

Third round

|}

Fourth round

|}

Quarter-finals

|}

Semi-finals

|}

Final

See also
1929 in Norwegian football

References

Norwegian Football Cup seasons
Norway
Cup